The Scottish League Two, known as cinch League Two for sponsorship reasons, is the fourth tier of the Scottish Professional Football League, the league competition for men's professional football clubs in Scotland. The Scottish League Two was established in July 2013, after the Scottish Professional Football League was formed by a merger of the Scottish Premier League and Scottish Football League.

Since the 2014–15 season, the bottom team has entered a play-off against the winner of a play-off between the winners of the Highland and Lowland Leagues for a place in the following season's competition.

Format
Teams receive three points for a win and one point for a draw. No points are awarded for a loss. Teams are ranked by total points, then goal difference, and then goals scored. At the end of each season, the club with the most points is crowned league champion. If points are equal, the goal difference determines the winner. If this still does not result in a winner, the tied teams must take part in a playoff game at a neutral venue to determine the final placings.

Promotion and relegation
The champions are directly promoted to the Scottish League One, swapping places with the bottom club of League One. The clubs finishing 2nd, 3rd, 4th in League Two, and the 9th placed team in League One then enter the two-legged League One play-off. The 2nd-placed League Two club plays the 3rd-placed League Two club, whilst the team who finished 4th in League Two will play the 9th-placed League One side. The winners of these ties will then play each other. If a League Two play-off winner prevails, that club is promoted, with the League One club being relegated. If the League One side is victorious, they then retain their place in League One.

Since season 2014–15, the bottom team in League Two enters a two-legged play-off against the winner of the Pyramid play-off between the Highland League and Lowland League champions. If the Highland or Lowland team wins the final they are promoted to League Two, and the team finishing 10th is relegated to the regional league they have chosen prior to the start of the season (previously this depended on whether they were north or south of 56.4513N latitude). If the League Two side wins the play-off, they retain their place in the following season's competition.

The following League Two play-off finals have been played:

Teams
Listed below are all the teams competing in the 2022–23 Scottish League Two season, with details of the first season they entered the fourth tier; the first season of their current spell in the fourth tier; and the last time they won the fourth tier.

Stadiums

Statistics

Championships

Top goalscorers

 

Italics denotes players still playing football,Bold denotes players still playing in Scottish League Two.

Notes

References

 
League Two
4
2013 establishments in Scotland
Sports leagues established in 2013
Sco
Professional sports leagues in Scotland